{{Album ratings
|rev1 = AllMusic
|rev1score = 
|rev2 = Blender Magazine
|rev2score = 
|rev3 = Daily Record
|rev3score = 
|rev4 = Entertainment Weekly
|rev4score = (favorable)
|rev5 = The Guardian
|rev5score = 
|rev6 = Prefix Magazine
|rev6score = 
|rev7 = Rolling Stone|rev7score = 
|rev8 = SPIN|rev8score = 
|rev9 = Stylus Magazine|rev9score = 
|rev10 = The Phoenix|rev10score = 
}}LeToya is the debut studio album by American R&B singer and former Destiny's Child member LeToya Luckett, released by Capitol Records on July 25, 2006 in the United States. The album spawned three singles: "Torn", "She Don't" and "Obvious". Besides the officially released singles, LeToya's debut album also includes the promo singles, "U Got What I Need" and "All Eyes On Me". LeToya co-wrote 10 out of the 14 tracks. The album was the first solo release from LeToya following her departure from her former group, Destiny's Child, of which she was a founding member.

The album garnered mostly positive reception from music critics, debuting at number one on the US Billboard 200. It was certified Platinum in December 2006.

Production
LeToya had "bottled up so many things, so many emotions, so many ideas" accumulated in many years away from the music world (as her claims on the Intro song "too much to tell ya"). Things like her dismissal from Destiny's Child, the deception with the shortly-formed Anjel and subsequent search for a new record deal has apparently made her a stronger person. Finally with a record deal, LeToya entered in studios recording songs for what would be her debut album. Finally about two years making, plans to the release the album came out- surprisingly becoming a number one album through the USA. Letoya worked with producers Dave Young, Scott Storch, Jermaine Dupri, Bryan Michael Cox, Just Blaze, Johnta Austin, Teddy Bishop, Flash Technology and JR Rotem. She also worked with artists such as Paul Wall, Slim Thug, Mike Jones and Rick Ross.

Commercial performanceLeToya debuted at number one on the US Billboard 200 and Billboard Top R&B/Hip-Hop Albums chart, with first week sales of 165,000 copies. On 	August 31, 2006, LeToya was certified Gold by the RIAA and Platinum on December 11, 2006. As of November 21, 2008, the album has sold 529,000 in the US.

The first single from the album was "U Got What I Need", with non-commercial purpose, but "All Eyes on Me", the second single, is claimed as her "original" first single, as this is the first track that showcased her as a solo artist. "Torn", the first official single from the album, was released in March 2006 and soon became a hit, having a high airplay and peaking at number 31 on the Billboard Hot 100 chart. "Torn" became a hit on the US Hot R&B/Hip-Hop Songs chart, peaking at number two. It also entered the top twenty on the Rhythmic Top 40 and Adult R&B charts. In the same year, the song was finally released worldwide, namely the United Kingdom, New Zealand, and Australia and became a moderate worldwide success. "Torn" had one of its biggest successes on BET's 106 & Park''. It reached number one in eleven days and stayed there for twenty-five days straight. It remained on the countdown for sixty-five days.

Track listing

Sample credits
"U Got What I Need" contains a sample of Love Unlimited's "Walking In The Rain (With The One I Love)".
"Torn" contains a sample of The Stylistics's 1971 classic "You Are Everything".
"She Don't" contains a sample of The Spinners's "We Belong Together" and samples from The Jackson 5's "Never Can Say Goodbye".
"All Eyes on Me" contains a sample of Sweet Charity's "Hey, Big Spender".
"Obvious" contains interpolations from "Break Hard, Dude" by AC/DC and samples Romeo Miller "Maybe".
"This Song" contains interpolations from Curtis Mayfied's "Eddie, You Should Know Better".
"Outro" contains an interpolations from Just A Prayer by Yolanda Adams and sample of Michael Jackson's 1982 "P.Y.T (Pretty Young Thing)".

Personnel
Executive producers: LeToya Luckett; Carl "Mister C" Cole;  Terry Ross
Mixing: Manny Marroquin (tracks 1, 6, 8–12, 14); Dave Russell (5); Kevin "KD" Davis (7); Jean-Marie Horvat (2, 3, 4); Jermaine Dupri (13, 15); Phil Tan (13, 15); Josh Houghkirk (assistant – 15)
Recording Engineers: Phil Tan (track 15); Jermaine Dupri (15); Danny Cheung (1, 3, 4, 7, 8, 9, 14, additional music – 2, 11, 12), Walter Millsap (additional music – 6), Dave Lopez (6); Terrence Cash (10), Dave Ashton (8); Ryan West (2), Tadd Mingo (assistant – 15); Pierre Medor of Tha Corna Boys (5); Sam Thomas (11); Leslie Brathwaite (7); John Horesco IV (13, 15);  Conrad Golding (12)
Additional vocals from: Candice Nelson (additional background vocals- 6); Dave Young (additional vocals- 11)
Art directions: Eric Roinestad
Design: Eric Roinestad
Photography: Dusan Reljin

Leftover tracks
 "Somethin' 4 Ya" (produced by Nisan) [iTunes limited time purchase]
 "When I Get Around Him" (produced by Teddy Bishop)
 "Nothing For Me" (produced by Mike City)
 "Tear Da Club Up (Original Mix)" (produced by Jazze Pha)
 "Keep It So Real" (featuring and produced by Jazze Pha)
 "The Truth"   (produced by Flash Technology)

Charts

Weekly charts

Year-end charts

Release history

References

2006 debut albums
LeToya Luckett albums
Albums produced by Bryan-Michael Cox
Albums produced by J. R. Rotem
Albums produced by Jermaine Dupri
Albums produced by Just Blaze
Albums produced by Scott Storch
Capitol Records albums
Albums produced by Jazze Pha